Listen to My Heart may refer to:

Film and television
 Listen to My Heart (film), a 2009 Japanese drama film
 Listen to My Heart (TV series), a 2011 South Korean television series

Music
 Listen to My Heart (Nancy LaMott album) or the title song, 1995
 Listen to My Heart (BoA album) or the title song, 2002
 "Listen to My Heart", a song written by Lanny Ross, Al Neibur and Abner Silver, 1939
 "Listen to My Heart", a song by The Bats, 1966
 "Listen to My Heart", a song by the Ramones from Ramones, 1976

See also
 Listen to Your Heart (disambiguation)